Gliese 581e  or Gl 581e is an extrasolar planet orbiting within the Gliese 581 system, located approximately 20.4 light-years away from Earth in the Libra constellation. It is the third planet discovered in the system (fourth if the disputed planet candidate Gliese 581d is included) and the first in order from the star.

The planet was discovered by an Observatory of Geneva team led by Michel Mayor, using the HARPS instrument on the European Southern Observatory  telescope in La Silla, Chile. The discovery was announced on 21 April 2009. Mayor's team employed the radial velocity technique, in which the orbit size and mass of a planet are determined based on the small perturbations it induces in its parent star's orbit via gravity.

At a minimum mass of 1.7 Earth masses, it is one of the least massive extrasolar planets discovered around a normal star, and relatively close in mass to Earth. It is also the exoplanet with the smallest accurate true mass known. At an orbital distance of just  from its parent star, however, it orbits further in than the habitable zone. It is unlikely to possess an atmosphere due to its high temperature and strong radiation from the star. Although scientists think it probably has a rocky surface similar to Earth, it is also likely to experience intense tidal heating similar to (and likely more intense than) that affecting Jupiter's moon Io. Gliese 581e completes an orbit around its parent star in approximately 3.15 days.

See also 
Habitability of red dwarf systems

References

External links 

Lightest exoplanet yet discovered European Southern Observatory press release
Scientists discover a nearly Earth-sized planet
Publications at Exoplanet.eu 

Exoplanets discovered in 2009
Exoplanets in the Gliese Catalog
Gliese 581
Near-Earth-sized exoplanets
Terrestrial planets
Libra (constellation)